How the Red Sun Rose: The Origins and Development of the Yan'an Rectification Movement, 1930–1945 is a book by Gao Hua published by the Chinese University of Hong Kong Press in 2000. It documents the ascendance of Mao Zedong as the absolute leader of the Chinese Communist Party. The book is banned in mainlaind China.

Background
Gao was born in May 1954 to non-intellectual parents. His father was labeled as a rightist during the Anti-Rightist campaign launched by the Chinese Communist Party (CCP). During his primary school years, Gao had been under increasing pressure in classroom talks on "class line" because of his family's problematic political background, and in 1963, Gao was rejected from the Nanjing Foreign Language School for failing the political vetting. This made him cast doubt on the policies of the CCP at the time. Before the Great Cultural Revolution, Gao repeatedly read Resolution Regarding Certain Historical Problems and Reform Our Study among Mao's Selected Works, which made Gao acquainted with the phrase "Rectification Movement."

During the Cultural Revolution, a series of events Gao witnessed made him harbor doubts on Mao. In 1966, Gao saw the beating of an art teacher by a CCP cadre's child using a rod due to the teacher's "bad class origins". In the same year, Gao's father was forced to flee due to fears of being beaten to death. The family of Gao's two schoolmates — a brother and sister — whose father was a "former counterrevolutionary", suffered constant humiliation and prejudice to the point that the mother could not contain her feelings and tore a portrait of Mao and shouted "reactionary slogans". As a result, she was executed during the One Strike-Three Anti Campaign in 1970. Her public trial was watched by Gao's school's entire student body, including her son and daughter, as required for education. After which the school's Revolutionary Committee required every class to hold group discussions where students declared their support for suppressing counterrevolutionaries. Gao recalled that after these events, he could not express his opinions on Mao to anyone.

It was also during the Cultural Revolution that Gao developed his interest into the CCP's history. He read Mao's internal speeches and material on "the struggle between the two roads", in which he noted the Yan'an Rectification Movement, whose events he could relate to the present. In 1978, he entered Nanjing University as a history major. However, all material he read about the Yan'an Rectification Movement portrayed it as a "great Marxists education campaign", and he attributed this phenomenon to Mao's "ultra-leftist" policies that resulted in contemporary Chinese's study of "taboo-infested official scholarship". Willing to write "unvarnished truth that took all sources into account", Gao started gathering materials in 1979. He began writing the book in 1991 and finished the manuscript in 1999. The book was published in 2000 by the Chinese University of Hong Kong Press.

Summary

The book begins from Mao's campaign to eliminate the Anti-Bolshevik League of 1930–31, to his marginalization of Soviet-trained dogmatists, then culminating to the Yan'an Rectification Movement of 1942–44, and concludes with the Seventh Party Congress in 1945 when Mao triumphed over his rivals in the CCP.

Reception
Reprinted twenty-two times in traditional Chinese and nine times in simplified Chinese, Gao's book has been regarded by many scholars as the transformer of scholarly understanding of the Yan'an era, including Professor David Chang of the Hong Kong University of Science and Technology. Chang notes that, whereas early scholarship subscribed to the idea that the Yan'an Rectification Movement was a healthy thought-reform, Gao's book has transformed that impression into a repressing and violent one. According to Chang, contemporary scholars who wrote positively of the CCP and Mao, such as Edgar Snow, were "sold a bill of goods" and whose work were "rendered obsolete" by Gao's book.

Pulitzer prize-winning journalist Ian Johnson also wrote highly of Gao's book:

References 

Works banned in China
History of the Chinese Communist Party
Books about Mao Zedong
2000 non-fiction books